Raúl Arellano Villegas (28 February 1935 – 12 October 1997) was a Mexican football forward who played for Mexico in the 1954 FIFA World Cup. He also played for C.D. Guadalajara.

References

External links
FIFA profile

1935 births
1997 deaths
Mexico international footballers
Association football forwards
C.D. Guadalajara footballers
Liga MX players
1954 FIFA World Cup players
Footballers from Jalisco
Mexican footballers